MS Spirit of France is a cross-channel ferry operated by P&O Ferries on the Dover-Calais route. She is the second of two 'Spirit' class ships built for P&O Ferries, the other being . The vessels are the largest ferries constructed for the Dover/Calais route and the largest ferries to ever cross the English Channel.

History
The new vessels were specifically designed for the Dover-Calais route and were built to Lloyd’s Register ‘Green Passport’ which provides a cradle to grave strategy for all materials used. The ferries are environmentally friendly, offering significant advances in fuel efficiency through a hydro-dynamically efficient hull form that optimise vessel performance with minimum fuel consumption.

The vessels are the first passenger ferries in the world to comply with the new International Maritime Organization "Safe Return to Port" requirements ahead of the international compliance date. These rules require that, in the event of a ship becoming a casualty, basic services are provided to all persons on board and that certain systems remain operational for safe return to port. Performance standards are stipulated for a wide range of ship systems including fire-fighting, power supply, propulsion, steering and navigation. The requirements come into force for vessels built after 1 July 2010.

The ships have the Lloyd's Register class notation of PSMR (Propulsion and Steering Machinery Redundancy) which will be assigned where the main propulsion and steering systems are configured to ensure that, in the event of equipment failure, the ship retains availability of propulsion power and manoeuvring capability to provide a safe return to port.

In early 2019, Spirit of France was reflagged from the Port of Dover England to Limassol, Cyprus in the lead up to Brexit due to the requirement by the owners of both Spirit Class vessels for these to remain under a European flag of registry.

13 May 2010: It was announced that P&O Ferries would be named  and Spirit of France. Spirit of Britain was expected to enter service in January 2011 followed by Spirit of France in September 2011. Spirit of France was originally to be called Olympic Pride, but was renamed to avoid copyright infringement.
8 June 2010: On the same day as the float out of Spirit of Britain, the keel of Spirit of France was laid at the STX Europe Rauma shipyard in Rauma, Finland. In keeping with maritime tradition `lucky' coins were placed under the keel by P&O Ferries chairman, Robert Woods.
December 2010: Registered owner and ship manager; P&O Ferries Ltd, Dover, United Kingdom.
18 February 2011: Floated out of the building dock at STX Europe's Rauma shipyard for the first time in sub zero temperatures.
18 February 2011: After her float out Spirit of France was manoeuvred to the fitting out quay.
May 2011: Fit out works continues apace with sea trials expected sometime in June 2011.

Sea trials and delivery
29 June 2011: Departed STX Rauma for her first sea trials in the Gulf of Bothnia.
6 September 2011: Further sea trials. Owing to vibration issues delivery is delayed.
13 October 2011: Further sea trials.
26 October 2011: Further sea trials.
13 November 2011: Further sea trials.
17 November 2011: Reported in some maritime news outlets that P&O had refused delivery due to vibration issues.
28 November 2011: During a storm the vessel parted her moorings and ran aground within the shipyard. The vessel was dry docked and damage was deemed to be negligible.
20 December 2011: Further sea trials.
3 January 2012: Final sea/yard acceptance trials completed.
24 January 2012: Official handover to P&O Ferries and commencement of her 1,400 mile journey to Dover.

P&O refused to accept delivery of the ship due to vibration problems during sea trials. Once all problems had been resolved, the ship arrived at Dover for the first time on Saturday 28 January 2012 at 11:08 (UTC), eight minutes after the scheduled arrival time. On 29 January 2012, Spirit of France started berthing trials in the Port of Dover and the following day arrived in Calais for berthing trials. It then departed for Dover and berthed at cruise terminal two for crew familiarisation. On Thursday 9 February 2012 Spirit of France departed Dover at 12:05 (UTC) carrying passengers for the first time, making its maiden voyage and beginning service for P&O Ferries.

Sister ships

References

Notes

Bibliography

Ferries of England
Ferries of France
Connections across the English Channel
2011 ships
Ships of P&O Ferries